Stephen Robert Isabalija, is a Ugandan civil servant, management professional, accountant, academic and academic administrator. He is the immediate past permanent secretary in the Ministry of Energy and Mineral Development in Uganda, having served in that capacity from November 2016, until his termination on 24 August 2017.

Prior to that, he served as the Vice Chancellor of Victoria University Uganda, a private, for-profit university owned by the Ruparelia Group, a business conglomerate in East Africa. He served in that capacity from September 2013 until November 2016.

Background
He was born in Fort Portal, Kabarole District, on 23 November 1976, to Chris Nyakahuma (deceased) and Lorraine K. Waako Akiiki (deceased).

Education
Stephen Isabalija attended Kinyamasika Demonstration School, in Fort Portal for his elementary school. For his O-Level education, he attended St. Leo’s College Kyegobe, also in Fort Portal. He transferred to Makerere College School, in Kampala, Uganda's capital and largest city, for his A-Level studies. From 1996 until 1998, he attended Nakawa College of Business Studies, the name of the institution that was the precursor of Makerere University Business School (MUBS). In 1997, he enrolled in the Bachelor of Commerce degree program at the main campus of Makerere University, graduating in 2001. For one year in 1998, he juggled degree classed at Makerere and diploma classes at Nakawa. Between 2002 and 2004, he studied for the degree of Master of Business Administration (MBA) in Finance and Accounting, at Makerere University, Main Campus. His degree of Doctor of Philosophy (PhD) in Public Policy (International Development), was obtained in 2011, from Southern University, in New Orleans, Louisiana, United States.

Work history
He started his career in 1999 immediately after finishing his diploma in business studies as finance specialist where he rose to the rank of Head of accounts at the ministry of water and environment (JPF); In 2005, Stephen Isabalija was hired as lecturer in the Graduate school and rose to the rank to Senior Lecturer at Makerere University Business School (MUBS). He was appointed Vice chancellor for Victoria university 2013. Besides his responsibilities at Victoria University, Uganda Electricity Generation Company Limited and Uganda Development Bank, he sits on the Boards of (a) Dynamic Group, where he is the Chairman (b) ICT University Foundation (c) Christian Discipleship Ministries International (d) ICT Centre, Makerere University Business School and (e) Uganda Women’s Entrepreneurship Association, where he is a Delegate.

On 4 November 2016, he was appointed the permanent secretary of the Ministry of Energy and Mineral Development, replacing Kabagambe Kaliisa, who became a presidential adviser on energy.

Academic Authorship 
He has also done research in his academic career which has been published in peer reviewed journals and some of the articles include; Factors affecting adoption, implementation and sustainability of Telemedicine information systems in Uganda. This study identified and discussed the key requirements for sustainable telemedicine in Uganda. A theoretical framework on the antecedents of E-Medicine sustainability in Sub-Saharan Africa: A mixed approach. SME adoption of enterprise systems in Sub-Saharan Africa: A clarion call to action. A framework for designing sustainable telemedicine information systems in developing countries. A framework for sustainable implementation of e-medicine in transitioning countries. A comparative study of e-Medicine uptake in Uganda, Nigeria and Ethiopia.

Other responsibilities
He sits on the Board of Directors of Uganda Development Bank (UDB). He is a married father of four children .

See also
 Uganda Universities
 Sudhir Ruparelia
 Uganda Conglomerates
 Uganda University Leaders

References

External links
 Website of the Uganda Ministry of Energy and Mineral Development

Living people
1976 births
Makerere University alumni
Makerere University Business School alumni
People educated at Makerere College School
People from Kabarole District
People from Western Region, Uganda
Southern University alumni
Toro people
Ugandan Christians
Academic staff of Victoria University Uganda